Powell Hill is a rounded, ice-covered prominence 6 nautical miles (11 km) west-southwest of Mount Christmas, overlooking the head of Algie Glacier. Named by Advisory Committee on Antarctic Names (US-ACAN) for Lieutenant Commander James A. Powell, U.S. Navy, communications officer at McMurdo Station during U.S. Navy Operation Deepfreeze 1963 and 1964.

Hills of the Ross Dependency
Shackleton Coast